Thomas Longridge Gooch (1 November 1808 – 23 November 1882) was civil engineer of the Manchester and Leeds Railway from 1831 to 1844.

Biography
Gooch was born on 1 November 1808. He was the eldest son of John and Anna Gooch; John was from Bedlington, Northumberland, and Anna was the daughter of Thomas Longridge of Newcastle. John and Anna had ten children, and of their five sons, four became railway engineers: Thomas Longridge Gooch; John Viret Gooch; Daniel Gooch and William Frederick Gooch.

On 6 October 1823, Gooch was apprenticed for six years to George Stephenson; with Stephenson, he surveyed the Newcastle and Carlisle Railway and for  years from 1826 acted as Stephenson's secretary and draughtsman on the Liverpool and Manchester Railway (L&MR), living in Stephenson's house in Liverpool. In January 1829, Gooch became Resident Engineer for the Liverpool end of the L&MR, but in April the same year he took a temporary appointment as Resident Engineer of the Bolton and Leigh Railway.

In 1830, Stephenson was appointed to survey the route of the proposed Manchester and Leeds Railway, and Gooch was appointed his assistant. Gooch carried out most of the actual surveying for the new line, and was in charge of the construction.

Notes

References

 

British railway civil engineers
British railway pioneers
1808 births
1882 deaths
Engineers from Tyne and Wear
People from Newcastle upon Tyne
19th-century British businesspeople